John Aleck Suchet  (born 29 March 1944) is an English author, television news journalist, and presenter of classical music on Classic FM.

Suchet has two brothers, one of whom is the actor Sir David Suchet.

Early life
Suchet was born in London, the son of Joan Patricia (née Jarché; 1916–1992), an actress, and Jack Suchet, (1908–2001) who emigrated from South Africa to England in 1932, and trained to be a doctor at St Mary's Hospital, London in 1933. Suchet's father was a consultant obstetrician and gynaecologist, working with Alexander Fleming on the role of penicillin in treating venereal disease. His maternal grandfather, James Jarché, was a famous Fleet Street photographer, notable for the first pictures of Edward VIII and Wallis Simpson and also for his pictures of Louis Blériot (1909) and the Siege of Sidney Street. Suchet's father was of Lithuanian Jewish descent, and his mother was English-born and Anglican (she was of Russian Jewish descent on her own father's side, and of English descent on her mother's side).

Suchet was brought up with his two brothers, David and Peter. He attended Uppingham School in Rutland before studying at Queen's College, Dundee (then a part of the University of St Andrews, now the University of Dundee), graduating in 1967 with a 2:2 in philosophy and political science. He was awarded an honorary doctorate from the University of Dundee in 2000. His younger brother, Sir David, is an actor, best known for his portrayal of Hercule Poirot in the television series Agatha Christie's Poirot. His youngest brother Peter is a retired advertising executive.

Career
Suchet began his career in journalism in 1967, when he was taken on as a graduate trainee by Reuters news agency. During that year he learned the basics of straightforward, unbiased news reporting.

In 1968 he was assigned to Reuters Paris bureau, where he covered the workers' and students' revolution that ultimately brought down President de Gaulle.

After a brief spell at BBC TV News, Suchet joined ITN as a scriptwriter/sub-editor in 1972. He became a reporter in 1976, and over the next decade he covered major national and international news stories, including the Iranian Revolution, the Soviet invasion of Afghanistan, and the Philippines Revolution. In 1987 he became a full time ITN newscaster, and until his retirement in 2004, presented all of ITN bulletins, including News at Ten. He was the main presenter of the Early Evening News from 1992 until 1999.

On the night of 16–17 January 1991, Suchet hosted ITN's all night coverage of the start of the Gulf War. The bulletin was the longest uninterrupted broadcast in ITN's history.

He also presented or contributed to numerous special event programmes on ITN and was a main commentator on ITN's coverage of Princess Diana's funeral, the wedding of Prince Edward and Sophie Rhys-Jones, and the funeral of the Queen Mother.

He retired from ITN in April 2004. He later presented Five News, initially for a six-month period from January 2006, then extended to Christmas 2007.

Suchet has also been a guest presenter for ITV's This Morning, as well as being a guest panellist on Five's The Wright Stuff. He hosted the revival of the quiz show Going for Gold on Channel 5.

Suchet has received several honours for his work as a TV reporter and newscaster. He received the RTS's 1986 TV Journalist of the Year award for his coverage of the Philippines Revolution, the citation commending his ability "to bring clarity to confused situations". In 1996 he received the TRIC Newscaster of the Year award. In 2008 the Royal Television Society awarded him its highest accolade, the Lifetime Achievement Award.

In July 2010, Suchet joined Classic FM as the regular host of the Sunday lunchtime music show (12:00–15:00). He had first appeared on the station in 2004 as guest presenter of the Composer's Notes series in which he examined the finances and wealth of famous composers. In September 2010 it was announced that he would be presenting the Classic FM weekday morning show (9:00–13:00) from January 2011, taking over from the show's previous host Simon Bates. This quickly became Classic FM's most listened-to show, with over 3 million listeners per week. He received two international awards for this show, from the Association for International Broadcasting and the New York Festivals. In 2020 he began hosting Classic FM's daily evening concert and continued to do so until 1 July 2022.

Suchet is an authority on the life and music of the composer Ludwig van Beethoven, and has become one of the UK's leading experts on Beethoven and his work. He has published seven books on Beethoven, beginning with the three-volume biographical novel "The Last Master" (1996–8). This was followed by "The Friendly Guide to Beethoven" (2006), "The Treasures of Beethoven" (2008), "Beethoven – The Man Revealed" (2012) and Beethoven – The Man Revealed (special anniversary edition, 2020). 

Suchet has also published biographies of Johann Strauss the Younger, "The Last Waltz" (2015), "Mozart – The Man Revealed" (2016), "Verdi - The Man Revealed" (2017) and "Tchaikovsky – The Man Revealed" (2018). In 2001 he was awarded Honorary Fellowship of the Royal Academy of Music.

Personal life
He is the father of RT presenter Rory Suchet, one of three sons from his first marriage.

Suchet and his second wife Bonnie had five grown-up sons between them from previous marriages. In 2006, Bonnie was diagnosed with Alzheimer's disease in her early 60s. Suchet appeared on the mainstream ITN/ITV and BBC news bulletins on 17 February 2009 to talk about this, to raise awareness of the disease and to campaign on behalf of Admiral Nurses. He explained that Bonnie would have no idea that he was on the news programmes. Bonnie died on 15 April 2015, aged 73.

In July 2016, John Suchet married Nula Black. She is the author of 2019 book The Longest Farewell, an account of her former husband James's dementia, and meeting Suchet via Bonnie at the care home.

Honours and awards
Suchet was appointed Officer of the Order of the British Empire (OBE) in the 2023 New Year Honours for services to journalism and charity.

 1986 Royal Television Society, TV Journalist of the Year
 1996 Television and Radio Industries Club, Newscaster of the Year
 2000 Honorary Doctor of Laws, University of Dundee
 2001 Honorary Fellowship, Royal Academy of Music
 2008 Royal Television Society, Lifetime Achievement Award
 2013 Association for International Broadcasting, Radio personality of the year
 2014 New York Festivals, Best radio personality

Books
 1997 The Last Master, a fictional biography of Beethoven: vol.1 Passion And Anger
 1998 The Last Master: vol.2 Passion and Pain
 1999 The Last Master: vol.3 Passion And Glory
 2006 Beethoven, The Friendly Guide
 2011 My Bonnie – How dementia stole the love of my life
 2008 The Treasures of Beethoven
 2012 Beethoven – The Man Revealed
 2015 The Last Waltz – The Strauss Dynasty and Vienna
 2016 Mozart – The Man Revealed
 2017 Verdi – The Man Revealed
 2018 Tchaikovsky – The Man Revealed
 2020 Beethoven – The Man Revealed (anniversary edition)

References

External links

The Classic FM Concert with John Suchet on Classic FM
John Suchet Waterstones

1944 births
5 News presenters and reporters
Living people
Alumni of the University of Dundee
British radio journalists
British television newsreaders and news presenters
English people of Lithuanian-Jewish descent
English people of Russian-Jewish descent
English people of South African-Jewish descent
English television journalists
People from Paddington
ITN newsreaders and journalists
Officers of the Order of the British Empire
People educated at Uppingham School